Puente de Vallecas is a station on Line 1 of the Madrid Metro. It is located in Zone A. It has been open to the public since 8 May 1923.

References 

Line 1 (Madrid Metro) stations
Railway stations in Spain opened in 1923
Buildings and structures in Puente de Vallecas District, Madrid